The Canadian Songwriters Hall of Fame (Panthéon des Auteurs et Compositeurs canadiens) is a Canadian non-profit organization, founded in 1998 by Frank Davies, that inducts Canadians into their Hall of Fame within three different categories: songwriters, songs, and those others who have made a significant contribution with respect to music.

History

Founder
Frank Davies founded the CSHF/PACC while he was on the board for the Canadian Academy of Recording Arts and Sciences (CARAS). His position was as the first music publisher appointee and as the voice for songwriters and publishers among the group of music industry professionals who oversee Canada's Juno Awards. Frank has had a long career in music, mainly as a record producer and music publisher, recently having received the Walt Grealis Special Achievement Award at the 2014 Juno Awards and the Harold Moon Special Achievement Award (SOCAN). He developed the Hall of Fame because he wanted increased public recognition for Canadian Songwriters.

SOCAN
In December 2011, SOCAN – the Society of Composers, Authors and Music Publishers of Canada acquired the assets of the Canadian Songwriters Hall of Fame. The Hall of Fame's mandate aligns with SOCAN's objectives as a songwriter and publisher membership-based organization. The CSHF continues to be run as a separate organization with its own board of directors.

Award
Northern Island (1927)
The award is a miniature replica of the sculpture 'Northern Island' created by Elizabeth Wyn Wood, who was born in Orillia, Ontario. Wood was a Canadian sculptor, who graduated from the Ontario College of Art (OCA) in 1926. The award was selected by Davies and established in the year 2003.

Wood took many trips to the Pickerel River crossing, which is halfway between Parry Sound and Sudbury. She sketched, explored, swam, and feasted in the area she was enchanted by. It was in 1927 that Wood completed the first of the island sculptures which conveyed her true and unique artistic character.

Frank Davies Founder's Award
The Frank Davies Founder's Award is given to individuals who have dedicated a lifetime to building the Canadian music industry. Recipients receive the Northern Island Award.

Legacy Award
The Legacy Award is presented to individuals who have contributed significantly to the development, promotion and preservation of Canadian songs and songwriters. Legacy Award inductees receive the Northern Island Award.

Mandate
The CSHF/PACC's mandate is to honour and celebrate Canadian songwriters and those who have dedicated their lives to the legacy of music, and to educate the public about these achievements.

Few people, Canadians included, are aware of the depth of Canada's rich musical heritage and the enormous impact the country's songwriters have had on contemporary music around the world. Canadian songwriters have penned hits for Rod Stewart, Frank Sinatra, The Rolling Stones, Gene Autry, Céline Dion, Barbra Streisand, Bob Dylan, Madonna, Bing Crosby, Jacques Brel, The Counting Crows, Louis Armstrong and André Gagnon, to name a few. The revelation of this news is always a source of great pride for Canadians and cause for admiration internationally.

Induction guidelines

Songwriters
Songwriters must be Canadian by birth or citizenship or have landed immigrant status and may be living or dead.
Songwriters must have written or co-written the music and/or lyrics to a song or catalogue of songs in one or more of the following categories:

 Having entered into popular culture and been sustained through oral tradition for a significant period of time;
 Having achieved substantial regional, national and/or international status whether culturally, commercially and/or socially;
 Having recorded a historical event or helped to define an era of popular culture;
 Having created or helped to create a genre of music.

Songwriters must have made a significant contribution through a song or catalogue of songs published, or otherwise made available to the public in some form, for at least twenty-five years. By virtue of their induction to the CSHF, a songwriter inductee's entire catalogue of work is also recognized and inducted into the Hall of Fame.

Recognition by era:

Songwriters and songs shall be recognized by era. All inductees are honoured equally and the eras simply provide a context for induction by allowing the CSHF to honour inductees, annually or otherwise, within a given span of years. The eras are:

 Pioneer Era – up to 1938 
 Radio Era – 1939 to 1969 
 Modern Era – 1970 to twenty-five years prior to the current year)

Songs
An eligible song is a musical work that consists of lyrics and music, or music alone without lyrics, and written wholly or in part by a Canadian (that is, Canadian by birth or citizenship or having landed immigrant status), living or dead, and may qualify in one or more of the following categories:

 Having entered into popular culture and been sustained through oral tradition for a significant period of time;
 Having achieved substantial regional, national and/or international status whether culturally, commercially and/or socially;
 Having recorded a historical event or helped to define an era of popular culture;
 Having created or helped to create a genre of music.

An eligible song may be an adaptation of an earlier musical work provided the adaptation is itself sufficiently original so as to qualify for copyright protection as a new musical work.

A translation is not eligible for song induction independent of the induction of the original musical work. However, if the translated lyrics are not a straight translation of the original lyrics but instead articulate a new and original meaning and sensibility such that the translated lyric is itself a new work capable of copyright protection as an adaptation separate from the original musical work (including a straight translation of that work) then the adapted musical work may qualify for song induction.

Songs may have been written by previous songwriter inductees or eligible songwriter inductees and are subject to the same timelines and guidelines regarding eras as apply to the songwriters.

Others
With respect to the induction of those individuals who have contributed significantly to the development and recognition of Canadian songs and songwriters (such as, but not limited to, publishers, performers, broadcasters and other members of the media, collectors and compilers of traditional material, performers of Canadian songs etc.) the board of directors will review any recommendations made to them by the Anglophone and Francophone Induction Committees. These awards are presented at the discretion of the Board of Directors.

Board approvals
In accordance with the CSHF bylaws, the number of inductees, if any, in any given year shall be at the discretion of the board.  The board shall also have the option to override guidelines in exceptional circumstances.

2008 inductees

Gala
The CSHF 2008 inductees were announced on 15 November 2007 at Toronto's Le Royal Meridien King Edward. The event was attended by over 150 artists, members of the media and other people in the industry. Performances at the press conference included: 
Suzie McNeil
Julie Crochetière
Dave Bourgeois
Cindy Daniel
Lawrence Gowan

The gala for this year's awards was conducted on 1 March 2008 at the Toronto Centre for the Arts and recorded for broadcast. Featured performances at the gala were:
Kyle Riabko		
Anik Jean
Yelo Molo			
Emilie-Claire Barlow
David Foster			
Rufus Wainwright
Martha Wainwright		
Boom Desjardins
Ellis Marsalis			
Branford Marsalis
Jully Black			
Serena Ryder
Gregory Charles		
Dione Taylor
Oliver Jones			
Toulouse
Lily Lanken   
CBC Radio 2 aired the gala broadcast on 2 March, and rebroadcast on CBC Radio 1 the following day. CBC Television aired its gala broadcast on 3 March. Performances from many French-language artists were omitted from the broadcasts, causing Hall of Fame honouree Claude Dubois to charge the CBC with racism and in turn prompted an apology from CBC vice-president Richard Stursberg.

Frank Davies Legacy Award
Oscar Peterson

Radio-era inductees

Songwriters 	
Alex Kramer
André Lejeune

Songs
Ain't Nobody Here But Us Chickens – Alex Kramer, Joan Whitney
Candy – Alex Kramer, Joan Whitney, Mack David
Il suffit de peu de choses – André Lejeune, Fernand Robidoux, Moune Victor
My Sister and I – Alex Kramer, Joan Whitney, Hy Zaret
Prétends que tu es heureux – André Lejeune
Une promesse – André Lejeune, Guy Godin

Modern-era inductees
Songwriters
Paul Anka - award presented by former Prime Minister Jean Chrétien
Claude Dubois

Songs		
Artistes – Claude Dubois
Aimes-tu la vie comme moi? – Georges Thurston, Billy Clements, Phillip Mitchell 
Canadiana Suite – Oscar Peterson
Comme un million de gens – Claude Dubois
Diana – Paul Anka
Femme de rêve – Claude Dubois
Heart Like a Wheel – Anna McGarrigle
Hymn to Freedom – Oscar Peterson, Harriette Hamilton
It Doesn't Matter Anymore – Paul Anka
Le Beat à Ti-Bi – Raoul Duguay
Le Labrador – Claude Dubois
L'infidèle – Claude Dubois
Love Child – R. Dean Taylor, Deke Richards, Pam Sawyer, Frank Wilson
My Way – Paul Anka, Claude François, Jacques Revauk, Gilles Thibault
Put Your Head on My Shoulder – Paul Anka
She's a Lady – Paul Anka
Signs – Les Emmerson

2010 inductees 
The 2010 awards were presented at a gala in Toronto on 28 March 2010 at the Toronto Centre for the Arts.

Legacy awards 
Musical archivist Edward B. Moogk received the Frank Davies Legacy Award. The Canadian Music Publishers Association Legacy Award was presented to music promoter Guy Latraverse.

Pioneer era songs 
 "Come Josephine in My Flying Machine", Alfred Bryan and Fred Fisher
 "Des mitaines pas de pouces", Ovila Légaré

Radio-era songs 
 "(There's a) Bluebird on Your Windowsill", Elizabeth Clarke
 "Deux enfants du même âge", Germaine Dugas

Modern era performers and songs 
The rock group Rush (Geddy Lee, Alex Lifeson and Neil Peart) was inducted in 2010 as were several of its songs:

 "Closer to the Heart" by Rush and Peter Talbot
 "Limelight" by Rush
 "The Spirit of Radio" by Rush
 "Subdivisions" by Rush
 "Tom Sawyer" by Rush and Pye Dubois

Francophone singer Robert Charlebois was also declared a modern era inductee, as was some of his songs:

 "Demain l'hiver" by Charlebois
 "Fu Man Chu" by Charlebois, Claude Gagnon, Marcel Sabourin
 "Les ailes d'un ange" by Charlebois
 "Lindberg" by Charlebois, Claude Péloquin, Louise Forestier and Pierre F. Brault
 "Ordinaire" by Charlebois and Claudette Monfette

Two songs neither related to Charlebois nor Rush were also inducted into the Hall of Fame:

 "The Hockey Theme", Dolores Claman
 "J'entends frapper", Michel Pagliaro

Inductees

Songwriters

Paul Anka
Randy Bachman
Beau Dommage
Roméo Beaudry
Mary Travers Bolduc
Shelton Brooks
Alfred Bryan
Édith Butler
Wilf Carter
Robert Charlebois
Bruce Cockburn
Leonard Cohen
Burton Cummings
Lionel Daunais
Serge Deyglun
Claude Dubois
Pye Dubois
Willie Eckstein
Raymond Egan
Jean-Pierre Ferland
Harmonium
Dan Hill
Ron Hynes
Alex Kramer
Félix Leclerc
André Lejeune
Pierre Létourneau
Claude Léveillée
Raymond Lévesque
Gordon Lightfoot
Carmen Lombardo
Joni Mitchell
Kim Mitchell
Bob Nolan
Christian Péloquin
Luc Plamondon
Francine Raymond
Robbie Robertson
Stan Rogers
Rush
Buffy Sainte-Marie
Eddie Schwartz
Jack Scott
Hank Snow
John Stromberg
Ian Tyson
Sylvia Tyson
Stéphane Venne
Gilles Vigneault
Neil Young

Special achievement
People who were not principally known as songwriters, but were inducted due to their importance in Canadian music history.

Marius Barbeau
Herbert Samuel Berliner
Henry Burr
Helen Creighton
Frank Davies
Yvan Dufresne
Lucille Dumont
Edith Fowke
Ernest Gagnon
Sam Gesser
Walt Grealis
Pierre Juneau
Stan Klees
Guy Latraverse
Edward B. Moogk
Anne Murray
Oscar Peterson

Songs

A-H

(Make Me Do) Anything You Want
À Québec au clair de lune
Les ailes d'un ange
Aimes-tu la vie comme moi?
Aimons-nous
Ain't No Cure for Love
Ain't We Got Fun?
Ain't Nobody Here but Us Chickens
American Woman
Aquarius
Artistes
As the Years Go By
Big Yellow Taxi
Big Wheels
Bird on the Wire
Black Fly Song
Bleu et blanc
Bluebird on Your Windowsill
Boo Hoo (You've Got Me Crying For You)
Born to be Wild
Both Sides Now
Câline de blues
Calling Occupants of Interplanetary Craft
Canadiana Suite
Un canadien errant
Candy
Chante-la ta chanson
Le ciel se marie avec la mer
Clap Your Hands
Closer to the Heart
Un coin du ciel
Come Josephine in My Flying Machine
Comme j'ai toujours envie d'aimer
Comme un million de gens
Cool Water
Dans nos vielles maisons
The Darktown Strutters' Ball
Demain l'hiver
Des croissants de soleil
Des mitaines pas de pouces
Deux enfants du même âge
Diana
En veillant su'l perron
Everybody Knows
The Facts of Life
Far Away Places
Farewell to Nova Scotia
Femme de rêve
Four Strong Winds
Frédéric
Le Frigidaire
Fu Man Chu
Gens du pays
A Guy is a Guy
Hallelujah
Hand Me Down World
Heart Like a Wheel
Hello, Hooray
Help Me
The Hockey Song
The Hockey Theme
Home For a Rest
Hot Child in the City
How About You?
The Huron Carol
Hymn to Freedom

I-P

I Heard the Bluebirds Sing
I Just Wanna Stop
I Saw Her Again
I Would Be The One
I'm Movin' On
I's the B'y
I'll Never Smile Again
I've Got Everything I Need (Almost)
If You Could Read My Mind
Il suffit de peu de choses
(It Takes) Diff'rent Strokes
It Doesn't Matter Anymore
J'ai la tête en gigue
J'entends Frapper
Je ne suis qu'une chanson
Je reviens chez nous
Je suis cool
K-K-K-Katy
L'infidèle
L'âme à la tendresse
L'adieu du soldat
La bitt à Tibi
La Manic
La Parenté
Le Labrador
Last Night I Had the Strangest Dream
Last Song
Lest You Forget
Let Your Backbone Slide
Limelight
Lindberg
Love Child
Marie-Hélène
Mille après mille
Moi, mes souliers
Mommy Daddy
Mon pays
Morning Dew
My Heart Cries For You
My Old Canadian Home
My Sister and I
My Swiss Moonlight Lullaby
My Way
No Sugar Tonight/New Mother Nature
No Time
Les nuits de Montréal
O Canada
Oh What a Feeling
Opportunity
Ordinaire
Paper Rosie
Paquetville
Pas Besoin de Frapper Pour Entrer
Peg O' My Heart
Pendant que
Peter's Dream
Le petit roi
Un peu plus haut, un peu plus loin
Play Me a Rock and Roll Song
Powder Your Face with Sunshine
Prétends que tu es heureux
Une promesse
Put Your Dreams Away (For Another Day)
Put Your Hand in the Hand
Put Your Head on My Shoulder

Q-T
Quand les hommes vivront d'amour
Québécois
The Red River Valley
Le réveil de la nature
Rise Up
S'Nice
The Safety Dance
She's a Lady
Si j'avais un char
Si j'étais un homme
Si les bateaux
Signs
Sing High, Sing Low
Sleepy Time Gal
Snowbird
Some of These Days
Something to Talk About
Song For the Mira
Spinning Wheel
The Spirit of Radio
Squid Jiggin' Ground
Subdivisions
Sugar, Sugar
Suzanne
Sweet City Woman
Sweethearts on Parade
Swinging Shepherd Blues
T'es mon amour, t'es ma maîtresse
There's a Love Knot in My Lariat
These Eyes
This Beat Goes On/Switchin' To Glide
This Wheel's On Fire
To Sir With Love
Tom Sawyer
Ton Visage
Le tour de l'île
Tumbling Tumbleweeds

U-Z
Universal Soldier
Vivre en amour
We'll Sing in the Sunshine
What a Friend We Have in Jesus
When I Die
When My Baby Smiles at Me
When You and I Were Young, Maggie
Wildflower
Woodstock
The World is Waiting for the Sunrise
You Turn Me On, I'm a Radio
You Were On My Mind

See also
 List of music museums

References

External links
Official website 

 
Music halls of fame
Halls of fame in Canada
Canadian music awards
Awards established in 1998
1998 establishments in Canada